The Journal of Child Language is a peer-reviewed academic journal covering all aspects of the scientific study of language behavior in children, the principles which underlie it, and the theories which may account for it. This includes various aspects of linguistics such as phonology, phonetics, morphology, syntax, vocabulary, semantics, pragmatics, and sociolinguistics. Its editor-in-chief is Heike Behrens (University of Basel). It was established in 1974 with David Crystal (Bangor University) as its founding editor. The journal is published by Cambridge University Press and is the official journal of the International Association for the Study of Child Language.

Abstracting and indexing 
The journal is abstracted and indexed in:
 Arts and Humanities Citation Index
 Linguistics and Language Behavior Abstracts
 Scopus
 EBSCOhost
 MLA International Bibliography
 Social Sciences Citation Index
According to the Journal Citation Reports, the journal had a 2013 impact factor of 1.505 ranking it 20th out of 169 journals in the category "Area Studies".

See also
List of applied linguistics journals

References

External links 
 

Linguistics journals
Language acquisition
Publications established in 1974
Cambridge University Press academic journals
English-language journals
Academic journals associated with learned and professional societies
5 times per year journals